Eric Ross Arthur,  (1 July 1898 – 1 November 1982) was a Canadian architect, writer and educator.

Born in Dunedin, New Zealand and educated in England, he served in World War I with the New Zealand Rifle Brigade. He emigrated to Canada in 1923 to teach architecture at the University of Toronto.

During the Centennial of the City of Toronto, in 1934, Arthur was on the "Toronto's Hundred Years" Publication Committee, which published Toronto's 100 Years.

Arthur was a professor until 1966, and remained a professor emeritus until his death. In 1964, he wrote the book, Toronto, No Mean City. In 1968, he was made a Companion of the Order of Canada.

References

External links
 

 Eric Arthur at The Canadian Encyclopedia
Eric Arthur archival papers held at the University of Toronto Archives and Record Management Services

1898 births
1982 deaths
Canadian architects
Companions of the Order of Canada
20th-century New Zealand architects
Writers from Toronto
Academic staff of the University of Toronto
Architects from Dunedin
New Zealand emigrants to Canada
New Zealand military personnel of World War I